ESM may refer to:

Education 
 Eastman School of Music, in Rochester, New York, United States
 Eastport-South Manor Central School District, in New York, United States
 East Syracuse-Minoa Central School District, in New York, United States
 East Syracuse-Minoa High School, in Manlius, New York, United States
 École secondaire de Mirabel, a secondary school in Quebec, Canada
 École spéciale militaire de Saint-Cyr, a French military academy
 Emmanuel School of Mission
 Engineering science and mechanics
 European School, Munich, in Germany

Science and technology 
 Earth System Model
 ECMAScript Modules
 Electronic support measures
 Embedded System Module
 End System Multicast, a research project at Carnegie Mellon University
 Energy Saving Module
 Enterprise systems management
 Ethosuximide, an antiepileptic drug
 European Service Module, part of the Orion spacecraft
 Event sampling methodology
 Experience sampling method

Transport 
 Colonel Carlos Concha Torres Airport, serving Esmereldas, Ecuador
 Elsenham railway station, in England
 Essex station (Montana), a train station in the United States

Other uses 
 Elektrani na Severna Makedonija, a power company in North Macedonia
 Election stock market
 Emergency Services Medal (Australia)
 Enterprise service management
 Esuma language
 Eurasian Youth Union, a Russian political organisation
 European Single Market
 European Social Movement, a defunct neo-fascist organisation
 European Sports Media
 European Stability Mechanism
 European Supermarket Magazine
 Extreme Speed Motorsports, an American auto racing team
 Enterprise Securities Market, a market of the Irish Stock Exchange